The Count Basie Center for the Arts is a landmarked performing arts center in Red Bank, New Jersey, United States.

In 1926 the building opened as the Carlton Theater and later, in 1973, became known as the Monmouth Arts Center. In 1984 it was renamed the Count Basie Theatre after re-known jazz musician and Red Bank native, William "Count" Basie. 

In 2018 the venue changed its name to the Count Basie Center for the Arts while the name of the theater itself was purchased and renamed the Hackensack Meridian Health Theatre.

The building was designed by architect William E. Lehman and has a seating capacity of 1,568.

History 

Edward Franklin Albee II opened the Carlton Theater on November 11, 1926 as one of a series of Keith-Albee-Orpheum vaudeville theaters. 

Opening night in 1926 included vaudeville acts and the feature film The Quarterback, starring Richard Dix. Nearly 4,000 people attended the two shows that evening, with crowds gathering two hours before the first performance. The New Jersey Register called the new theatre “…a marvel of beauty, convenience and comfort. Outside and inside it is a veritable and architectural triumph.”

Because of financial struggles and declining movie attendance nationally, Albee was removed from the leadership of the theater. The theater chain was acquired by Keith-Albee-Orpheum in 1928 and then led by Joseph P. Kennedy Sr, father of John F. Kennedy.  

The Carlton Theater closed in 1970 after the Strand, the Palace, the Empire, and the Lyric theaters had also closed. In 1973 a significant anonymous donation allowed the Monmouth County Arts Council to preserve and reopen the theater for cultural use, and the theater was renamed the Monmouth Arts Center.

In 1984 the building was renamed as the Count Basie Theatre, in memorial to William “Count” Basie who had died that year. The Monmouth County Arts Council operated the theater until June 30, 1999, when the not-for-profit corporation Count Basie Theatre, Inc. managed, program, and preserve the theater.

As part of its $26 million expansion, the venue adopted the name Count Basie Center for the Arts on May 14, 2018. Later that year, Hackensack-Meridian Health acquired naming rights for the Center's historic theater, rebranding it as Hackensack Meridian Health Theatre. In 2020, the Center's second venue, The Vogel, opened with small, 150-person capacity performances on account of the COVID-19 pandemic.

Shows
Besides Count Basie, musicians such as James Brown and Tony Bennett, as well as headline performers such as Al Green, George Carlin, Boz Scaggs, Counting Crows, Olivia Newton-John, Brian Wilson, "Weird Al" Yankovic, Ben E. King, Darlene Love and Jon Stewart, have performed at the theater. Bruce Springsteen made several surprise guest appearances and Jon Bon Jovi attended and organized many charity concerts. The New Jersey Symphony Orchestra and the Monmouth Symphony Orchestra are regularly scheduled.

Community outreach 

The Count Basie Center Performing Arts Academy offers professional training courses in performance basics, audition techniques, professional development, and weekend workshops. Past participants in the Performing Arts Academy who have gone on to notable performance careers include singer, songwriter, and record producer, Charlie Puth, Broadway actress, Jillian Mueller, The X Factor finalist Cari Fletcher, The Voice runner-up, Jacquie Lee, Steve Vai, keyboardist Michael Arrom, and Conan Gray bassist Christine Meisenhelter.

On May 26, 2006, the organization presented its first annual Basie Awards for excellence in high school theater in Monmouth County, New Jersey. The May 2008 presentations were hosted by Joe Piscopo, while the May 2009 presentations were hosted by Siobhan Fallon Hogan. The 2010 awards were not hosted.  The announced host Big Joe Henry, a disk jockey for NJ 101.5 radio, pulled out because of a threat of protests by the New Jersey Education Association, which had disagreed with the radio station for its political views and talks urging listeners to vote against state spending for education and the arts.

The building 

Between 1995 and 2001, the arts council/corporation conducted a series of phased projects to repair and stabilize the infrastructure of the building. Phase 1 of a new renovation series was completed in 2004, replacing the seating with historically accurate seats; adding alabaster lighting fixtures to the auditorium; and restoring and painting a side-panel of plasterwork. Over $1 million has been spent on theater improvements to date, funded by donations and the New Jersey State Council on the Arts in 2010. A  $28 million capital campaign was started in 2016 to support an expansion that doubled the Center's footprint, adding a second venue, The Vogel, the Grunin Arts Education Building, a new member lounge, and significant increases in size to the Basie's original theater lobby.

Seating includes 1,008 orchestra, 121 loge, 402 balcony, and 12 wheelchair-accessible platforms. The Vogel holds 800 persons standing.

External links
 "The Buzz About the Basie", Asbury Park Press, 6 January 2008

References

Red Bank, New Jersey
Buildings and structures in Monmouth County, New Jersey
Performing arts centers in New Jersey
Theatres in New Jersey
Music venues in New Jersey
Event venues established in 1926
1926 establishments in New Jersey
Theatres completed in 1926
Theatres on the National Register of Historic Places in New Jersey
National Register of Historic Places in Monmouth County, New Jersey
New Jersey Register of Historic Places